Mark Blake may refer to:

Mark Blake (Australian rules footballer) (born 1985)
Mark Blake (footballer, born 1967), English footballer
Mark Blake (footballer, born 1970), English footballer
Mark Blake (writer) (fl. 2000s), British writer
Mark Blake (politician) (died 1886), Member of Parliament for Mayo